Jeffrey Bergman (born July 10, 1960) is an American voice actor and impressionist who has provided the modern-day voices of various classic cartoon characters, most notably with Looney Tunes and Hanna-Barbera.

Bergman was the first to replace Mel Blanc as the voice of Bugs Bunny and several other Warner Bros. cartoon characters following Blanc's death in 1989. Bergman shared the roles of Blanc's characters with Greg Burson and Joe Alaskey before their respective deaths in 2008 and 2016, as well as Bob Bergen, Billy West, Jim Cummings, Maurice LaMarche, Fred Tatasciore, and Eric Bauza for various Warner Bros. Animation productions.

Early life
Bergman was born on July 10, 1960 to a Jewish family in Philadelphia, Pennsylvania. Throughout his early life, he impersonated several celebrities and cartoon characters, his first impression being comic influence Ed Sullivan at the age of 6. At the age of 15, Bergman began doing impressions of various Looney Tunes characters. 

He studied theater and communications at the University of Pittsburgh where he first did voice work after becoming involved with a student-run radio station and interning at the KQV and WDVE radio stations. While there, he made his first demo reel and was profiled in a story on KDKA-TV's Evening Magazine. The story was picked up on similar TV news magazines shows and helped land him his representation with William Morris Agency following his graduation from Pitt in 1983. 

During his time at university, Bergman attended an on-campus lecture by Mel Blanc, who was best known for voicing the Looney Tunes such as Bugs Bunny. Bergman later tracked Blanc down and met him at his Oakland hotel room in 1981, where Bergman imitated Blanc's characters for him, earning himself a 45-minute session. Bergman credits Blanc with helping him graduate two years later.

Career
Bergman voiced the Pillsbury Doughboy from 1986 to 2013 following Paul Frees' death in 1986. Bergman's work with Warner Bros. began in 1986, recording voices for The Bugs Bunny Show. After being rebuffed several times by Warner Bros. directors, he recorded a tape of himself as several of Blanc's characters, including Bugs Bunny. He took the tape to the production company and used a switch to toggle back and forth between his work and the original Mel Blanc recording. Then-Warner Bros. president Edward Bleier was unable to tell the difference between the voices, and Bergman, at the age of 29, became the first performer to provide the voice of Bugs Bunny after Mel Blanc died on July 10, 1989 – Bergman's 29th birthday.

Bergman's first performance as Bugs Bunny was during the 62nd Academy Awards as Bugs presented the Oscar for Best Live Action Short Film. He voiced Bugs, as well as Daffy Duck, during the 1990 TV specials Cartoon All-Stars to the Rescue and The Earth Day Special (also voicing Tweety Bird and Porky Pig in the latter). That same year, he also lent his voice to Bugs, Daffy and Porky in the animated sequences of Gremlins 2: The New Batch (1990). Bergman later voiced Bugs and Daffy again as well as Elmer Fudd in the 1991 theatrical short Box-Office Bunny, Bugs's first in over 25 years. He voiced Bugs, Daffy, Elmer and Yosemite Sam in the 1991 short (Blooper) Bunny, as well as several characters (including Sylvester the Cat and Foghorn Leghorn) in animated TV specials and newer animated series such as Tiny Toon Adventures and The Plucky Duck Show.

Outside of the Looney Tunes, Bergman also voiced George Jetson and Mr. Spacely in Jetsons: The Movie (1990) when their previous voice actors George O'Hanlon and Mel Blanc both died during production; he had been working at his local radio station in Pennsylvania when he received the call to travel to California and complete the dialogue. He also voiced George Jetson in the theme park attraction The Funtastic World of Hanna-Barbera. By the mid-1990s, Bergman decided to not continue voicing the Looney Tunes, due to reluctance about relocating to Los Angeles. At the time, he was living in Pittsburgh so Warner Bros. hired other voice actors such as Joe Alaskey (who was the first person to replace Blanc as the voice of Yosemite Sam in Who Framed Roger Rabbit in 1988), Greg Burson, Bob Bergen, Billy West and Blanc's son Noel Blanc.

Throughout the 1990s and 2000s, Bergman continued voicing various Hanna-Barbera characters, namely Fred Flintstone, in newer specials such as The Flintstones: On the Rocks following Henry Corden's retirement from the role in 2000, only understudying the voices of the Looney Tunes in times when Alaskey and West were not available. In 2003, he voiced Bugs in a sketch on the NBC comedy show Saturday Night Live. Eventually, after almost 20 years, and after sporadically appearing as the Looney Tunes characters for nearly two decades, he returned as the voice of Bugs Bunny, Daffy Duck, Foghorn Leghorn, Sylvester the Cat, Pepé Le Pew and Tweety in 2011's The Looney Tunes Show. He also returned for the 2015 series New Looney Tunes, voicing Bugs, Foghorn, Sylvester and Elmer Fudd, as well as other minor characters such as Michigan J. Frog. He also voices some characters in Looney Tunes Cartoons; Eric Bauza voices Bugs, Daffy, and Tweety for that series, with Bergman handling Foghorn, Sylvester and Elmer Fudd.

Bergman is a recurring cast member on Family Guy, usually voicing Fred Flintstone and Sylvester the Cat, as well as The Cleveland Show and American Dad!.

From 2000 until 2015, Bergman was also the voice of Turner Broadcasting's Boomerang.

Bergman had a recurring role as a radio intern Gus Kahana on the AMC comedy-drama Remember WENN, which aired in the late 1990s. He also provided the voice of Zap in Skylanders: Spyro's Adventure, Skylanders: Giants, Skylanders: Swap Force, Skylanders: Trap Team, Skylanders: SuperChargers, and Skylanders: Imaginators.

More recently, Bergman became the new voice of Eustace Bagge in the Courage the Cowardly Dog/Scooby-Doo crossover, Straight Out of Nowhere, replacing the previous voice actors, the late Lionel Wilson and the late Arthur Anderson.

Characters
Bergman has voiced a large quantity of characters over his career. His vocal repertoire includes Bugs Bunny, Daffy Duck, Sylvester the Cat, Tweety, Foghorn Leghorn, Elmer Fudd, Porky Pig, Marvin the Martian, Pepé Le Pew, Taz, Yosemite Sam, Speedy Gonzales, Yogi Bear, Huckleberry Hound, Quick Draw McGraw, Snagglepuss, Boo Boo, Ranger Smith, Wally Gator, Pixie and Dixie, Baba Looey, Mr. Jinks, Top Cat, Officer Dibble, Peter Potamus, George Jetson, Elroy Jetson, Astro, Mr. Spacely, Garfield, Fred Flintstone, Barney Rubble, Dino, Lippy the Lion, Mr. Incredible, Hadji, Dr. Benton C. Quest, Race Bannon, Squiddly Diddly, Fleegle, and Droopy.

Personal life
Bergman lives in Los Angeles, California and has adult two sons.

Filmography

Film

Television

Video games

Theme parks

References

External links
 
 Jeff Bergman at Voice Chasers 
 Jeff Bergman  – TV.com
 Jeff Bergman Credits – TV Guide

1960 births
Living people
20th-century American comedians
20th-century American male actors
21st-century American comedians
21st-century American male actors
American impressionists (entertainers)
American male comedians
American male voice actors
Comedians from Pennsylvania
Hanna-Barbera people
Jewish American male actors
Male actors from Philadelphia
University of Pittsburgh alumni